Total is an American R&B girl group and one of the signature acts of the Bad Boy Records imprint during the mid 1990s. The group consists of founding members Kima Raynor, Keisha Spivey, and Pamela Long. Total is best known for their feature on Mase's "What You Want", as well as their hits "Kissin' You", "Can't You See" (featuring The Notorious B.I.G.), and "What About Us?" and "Trippin'", both featuring Missy Elliott. Long also sung the chorus of the Notorious B.I.G.'s hit song "Hypnotize", although she was not officially credited. Total made their first appearance singing the hook on The Notorious B.I.G.'s debut single, "Juicy", widely considered one of the greatest hip-hop songs of all time.

In 2019, Pamela Long announced that she is working on her debut solo album. She released a video for her single "Why".

Discography

Studio albums
 Total (1996)
 Kima, Keisha, and Pam (1998)

References

American contemporary R&B musical groups
Bad Boy Records artists
African-American girl groups
Musical groups from New Jersey
Musical groups established in 1994
Musical groups disestablished in 2001
Musical groups established in 2014
1994 establishments in New Jersey